The 2014–15 Atlantic 10 Conference men's basketball season was the 39th season of Atlantic 10 Conference basketball. The season marked the first for new member, Davidson. The 2015 Atlantic 10 men's basketball tournament was held at the Barclays Center in Brooklyn, New York.

The defending regular season champion was Saint Louis and the defending tournament champion was Saint Joseph's.

Davidson won the regular season championship. VCU was the A-10 tournament champion. VCU earned the conference's automatic bid to the NCAA tournament.

Conference Awards

References